Hoà Hảo   is a rural commune (xã) and village of the Chợ Mới District of An Giang Province, Vietnam.  After 1975, Hòa Hảo was renamed 'Phú Tân'.  Given that Hòa Hào village was historically strictly tied to Hoa Hao Buddhism, the villagers and adherents of this religion always called 'Làng Hòa Hảo' as a traditional sacred site'.  On 18 May each year, a large pilgrimage takes place to this place and makes it one of the most visited areas of Southwestern region of Vietnam.  Hòa Hảo also means 'harmony' that suits the overall philosophy of the religion founded here back to 1939.

Communes of An Giang province
Populated places in An Giang province